, more commonly known as samfree or SAM, was a Japanese music producer heavily involved in composing and arranging songs using Vocaloid software. He was also notably involved in producing theme songs for various anime television series.

Biography
Samfree first came into prominence releasing various Vocaloid-based music online; his song Luka Luka Night Fever, released on Nico Nico Douga in February 2009, quickly became popular on the website and remains one of his most notable works today. Having written both the music composition and lyrics for the song, samfree utilised the voice of Megurine Luka using the Vocaloid software to create the vocals. Within the span of a year, the original song received over 1.7 million views on Nico Nico Douga. The song would later on form part of samfree's "Night Series" of Vocaloid music tracks.

Following a series of agreements with various studios, samfree composed and arranged character songs, opening and closing theme songs for anime series such as Wish Upon the Pleiades, Mushibugyo, Good Luck Girl!, Tegami Bachi: Reverse and Katanagatari. His sixth album, titled Fever, was released in September 2011. In 2012, samfree composed promotional music for convenience store chain Lawson. In addition, his music tracks have been featured in video games such as the Hatsune Miku: Project DIVA series. Samfree made live performances during various Vocaloid concert events, including 39's Giving Day Live Concert in 2010, and at Miku Expo 2014.

Samfree died on September 24, 2015 at the age of 31; while the precise cause of death has not been publicly revealed, an announcement made by his family stated that it was a "sudden death that was not due to external causes".

Discography

Original releases

Singles

Collaboration works

Other releases

Anime television series

Video games

References

External links

Blog
Official Twitter/

1984 births
2015 deaths
21st-century Japanese composers
21st-century Japanese male musicians
Anime composers
Japanese film score composers
Japanese male film score composers
Japanese music arrangers
Vocaloid musicians